Liv Andersen (9 August 1919 in Oslo – 21 March 1997) was a Norwegian politician for the Labour Party.

She was elected to the Norwegian Parliament from Oppland in 1969, and was re-elected on three occasions. She had previously served as a deputy representative during the term 1965–1969.

On the local level she was a member of the executive committee of Gjøvik municipality council from 1963 to 1971. From 1967 to 1971 she was also a member of Oppland county council. She chaired the county party chapter from 1967 to 1970.

References

1919 births
1997 deaths
Members of the Storting
Labour Party (Norway) politicians
Politicians from Gjøvik
Women members of the Storting
20th-century Norwegian women politicians
20th-century Norwegian politicians